Xylocopa bryorum, or Xylocopa (Koptortosoma) bryorum, is a species of carpenter bee. It is distributed in Sri Lanka, Maldives, Bangladesh, Laos, Vietnam, Thailand.

References

Further reading
Ruggiero M. (project leader), Ascher J. et al. (2013). ITIS Bees: World Bee Checklist (version Sep 2009). In: Species 2000 & ITIS Catalogue of Life, 11 March 2013 (Roskov Y., Kunze T., Paglinawan L., Orrell T., Nicolson D., Culham A., Bailly N., Kirk P., Bourgoin T., Baillargeon G., Hernandez F., De Wever A., eds). Digital resource at www.catalogueoflife.org/col/. Species 2000: Reading, UK.
John Ascher, Connal Eardley, Terry Griswold, Gabriel Melo, Andrew Polaszek, Michael Ruggiero, Paul Williams, Ken Walker, and Natapot Warrit.

External links
 Animaldiversity.org
 Itis.gov

bryorum
Fauna of Southeast Asia
Insects described in 1775
Taxa named by Johan Christian Fabricius